The QSA code and QRK code are interrelated and complementary signal reporting codes for use in wireless telegraphy (Morse code). An enhanced format, SINPO code, was published in the ITU Radio Regulations, Geneva, 1959, but is longer and unwieldy for use in the fast pace of Morse code communications.

Current format 
The current definition of the QSA and QRK codes are officially defined in ITU Radio Regulations 1990, Appendix 13: Miscellaneous Abbreviations and Signals to Be Used in Radiotelegraphy Communications Except in the Maritime Mobile Service, and are also described identically in ACP131(F),:

Historical development 
The QSK code is one of the earliest signal reporting formats and is a part of the Q code used for commercial radiotelegraph communication, appearing as one of the twelve Q Codes listed in the 1912 International Radiotelegraph Convention Regulations, and was later adopted by other radio services, especially amateur radio. The QSA code was mandated by the Madrid Convention (Appendix 10, General Regulations) sometime prior to 1936, and specified the following reporting format, as found in the 1936 edition of the ARRL's The Radio Amateur's Handbook and Radiotelegraph & Radiotelephone Codes, Prowords, and Abbreviations.

The book goes on to note that "Some of the definitions, however, appear to confuse audibility or signal strength with readability, which may be impaired even when signals are strong, by atmospherics, interference, a noisy receiver, etc.", and that because of this Amateurs supplemented the QSA system reports with a readability scale, called the R-System, which used a scale of 1 to 9. The book describes the QSA- and R-systems immediately after describing the R-S-T system, and notes that the R-S-T report format, because it is three digits long, cannot be confused with either of the earlier systems. The book does not clarify the method for requesting an R-S-T report instead of a QSA report.

The U.S. Navy's Communications Instructions of 1929 prescribed a different set of codes for the response: However, for joint Army-Navy operations, the K signal was replaced with the S signal, with exactly the same definitions.

An expanded QRK code was first defined to go along with the earlier QSA code in the ITU Radio Regulations Cairo, 1938.

FM 24-6 Radiotelegraph signal report format 
The 1945 U.S. Army Radio Operator's Manual, FM 24-6 defines the radiotelegraph signal report format as follows:

FM 24-6 further states, "Readability and signal strength reports indicate the desired method of transmission and should be used in that sense. Readability and signal strength reports are not exchanged unless "3" or less, lack of any report being assumed to indicate satisfactory communications."

The report example given below uses military call signs and the obsolete Q Code of QJS for readability instead of the current QRK:

CCB signal strength and readability 
The 1943–1945 Combined Communications Board Publications, including CCBP 3-2: Combined Radiotelephone (R/T) Procedure, describe a slightly newer radiotelephony version of the radiotelegraph procedure described in the U.S. Army Radio Operator's Manual, FM 24-6:(a) A station is understood to have good readability unless otherwise notified. Strength of signals and readability will not be exchanged unless one station cannot clearly hear another station.
(b) The response to "How do you hear me?" will be a short concise report of actual reception such as "Weak but readable," "Strong but distorted," "Loud and clear," "Strength Four," etc.At least in CCBP 3–2, no additional detail is given about what the range of the numeric scale is, or the complete list of strength and readability code words are.

See also 

Other signal reporting codes
Plain language radio checks
R-S-T system (for Amateur radio only)
SINPO code
Signal strength and readability report
Circuit Merit (for wired telephone circuits only)

References

Operating signals